This is a list of Earls (Suo jure or jure uxoris) during the reign of Henry IV of England who reigned from 1399 to 1413.

The period of tenure as Earl is given after the name and title(s) of each individual, including any period of minority.

Earl of Arundel
Thomas Fitzalan, 12th Earl of Arundel, 10th Earl of Surrey (1399–1415)

Earl of Devon
Edward de Courtenay, 3rd Earl of Devon (1377–1419)

Earl of Huntingdon (Fourth creation)
John Holland, 1st Duke of Exeter, 1st Earl of Huntingdon (1388–1400)

Earl of Kent (Sixth creation)
Thomas Holland, 1st Duke of Surrey, 3rd Earl of Kent (1397–1400)
Edmund Holland, 4th Earl of Kent (1400–1408)

Earl of March
Edmund Mortimer, 5th Earl of March (1398–1425)

Earl of Norfolk (Third creation)
Thomas de Mowbray, 4th Earl of Norfolk, 2nd Earl of Nottingham (1399–1405)
John Mowbray, 2nd Duke of Norfolk, 5th Earl of Norfolk, 3rd Earl of Nottingham (1405–1432)

Earl of Nottingham (Second creation)
Thomas de Mowbray, 4th Earl of Norfolk, 2nd Earl of Nottingham (1399–1405)
John Mowbray, 2nd Duke of Norfolk, 5th Earl of Norfolk, 3rd Earl of Nottingham (1405–1432)

Earl of Oxford
Aubrey de Vere, 10th Earl of Oxford (1393–1400)
Richard de Vere, 11th Earl of Oxford (1400–1417)

Earl of Richmond (Second creation restored)
Arthur III, Duke of Brittany, Earl of Richmond (1393–1425)

Earl of Salisbury (Second creation)
John Montagu, 3rd Earl of Salisbury (1397–1400)
Thomas Montagu, 4th Earl of Salisbury(1400–1428)

Earl of Somerset (Second creation)
John Beaufort, 1st Earl of Somerset(1397–1410)
Henry Beaufort, 2nd Earl of Somerset (1410–1418)

Earl of Stafford
Edmund Stafford, 5th Earl of Stafford (1395–1403)
Humphrey Stafford, 1st Duke of Buckingham, 6th Earl of Stafford (1403–1460)

Earl of Suffolk (Third creation)
Michael de la Pole, 2nd Earl of Suffolk (1398–1399) (1399–1415)

Earl of Surrey
Thomas Fitzalan, 12th Earl of Arundel, 10th Earl of Surrey (1400–1415)

Earl of Warwick
Thomas Beauchamp, 12th Earl of Warwick (1369–1401)
Richard Beauchamp, 13th Earl of Warwick (1401–1439)

Earl of Westmorland
Ralph Neville, 1st Earl of Westmorland (1397–1425)

References

Sources 
Ellis, Geoffrey. (1963) Earldoms in Fee: A Study in Peerage Law and History. London: The Saint Catherine Press, Limited.

British monarchy-related lists
Henry IV
Henry IV of England